Shann is a surname. Notable people with the surname include:

 Edward Shann (1884–1935), Australian economist
 George Shann (1876–1919), British politician
 Mick Shann (1917–1988), Australian public servant and diplomat

See also
 Jay McShann (1916–2006), American jazz pianist
 Shann Ray (born 1967), American poet and novelist
 Shann Schillinger (born 1986), American football safety